Cordt Weinstein (born March 2, 1972) is an American retired professional soccer player who played nine seasons with the Long Island Rough Riders.

Player
Weinstein attended Southern Connecticut State University, playing on the men's soccer team from 1989 to 1993.  In 1990 and 1992, Weinstein and his team mates won the NCAA Division II Men's Soccer Championship.  In 1994, Weinstein signed with the Long Island Rough Riders of the USISL.  In 1996, the Rough Riders loaned Weinstein to the New York Fever of the A-League for the months of August and September.  In 2001, Weinstein was loaned to MetroStars.

Coach
In 1993, Weinstein became an assistant coach at St. John the Baptist Diocesan High School in West Islip, New York. He was elevated to head coach in 2002.

Statistics

References

External links 
 Profile on MetroFanatic
 

1972 births
Living people
American soccer players
Soccer players from New York (state)
Association football forwards
Southern Connecticut Fighting Owls men's soccer players
Long Island Rough Riders players
New York Fever players
New York Red Bulls players
Major League Soccer players
A-League (1995–2004) players
People from Deer Park, New York